is a Japanese actor and voice actor. He played paternal figures or mentors in various anime and audio productions.

Filmography

Anime series
Yu Yu Hakusho (1994) – Raizen
Lupin III: The Secret of Twilight Gemini (1996) – Jean Piere
Master Keaton (1998) – Leon Papas
Case Closed (????) – Yasuyuki Murakawa
Niea Under 7 (????) – Nenji Yoshioka
Heat Guy J (????) – J
Princess Tutu (????) – The Raven
Gad Guard (????) – Drugef
Naruto (????) – First Hokage: Hashirama Senju
Samurai Champloo (????) – Kagetoki Kariya
Burst Angel (????) – Leo Jinno
Bleach (????) – Zangetsu
Monster (????) – Dr. Gielen
Hell Girl (????) – Wanyūdō
Shakugan no Shana (????) – Tenmoku Ikko
Honey & Clover (????) – Tokudaiji
Full Metal Panic! (????) – Mayer Amit
Rockman.EXE Beast (????) – Kunio Kurogane
Glass Fleet (????) – Pope Goruna
Hell Girl: Two Mirrors (????) – Wanyūdō
Buso Renkin (????) – Captain
Blood+ (????) – Gray
Yōkai Ningen Bem (????) – Zojimofu
Hero Tales (????) – Sōei
D.Gray-man (????) – Devon
Tengen Toppa Gurren Lagann (????) – Narration, Simon (Ep. 27)
Baccano! (????) – Goose Parkins
Bokurano: Ours (????) – Hasegawa
Detective Conan (????) – Tatsuhito Funamoto
Rocket Girls (????) – Isao Nasuda
Gogol 13 (????) – Duchess
Hell Girl: Three Vessels (????) – Wanyūdō
Zettai Karen Children (????) – Colonel J.D. Grisham
Birdy the Mighty: Decode (????) – Shōri Nakasugi
Tower of Druaga: The Sword of Uruk (????) – Gramps
Bihada Ichizoku (????) – SMK
Blade of the Immortal (????) – Habaki Kagimura
Lupin the Third: Sweet Lost Night (????) – Gordon
Guin Saga (????) – Urado
Slayers Evolution-R (????) – Shuryō
Natsume's Book of Friends (????) – Yōkai
Birdy the Mighty: Decode 2 (????) – Dax
Yu-Gi-Oh! 5D's (????) – José
Modern Magic Made Simple (????) – Carl
Yu-Gi-Oh! 5D's (????) – Old Aporia
One Piece (????) – Shiryu
Gintama (????) – Doromizu Jirochō
Gosick (????) – Marquis Albert de Blois
Shakugan no Shana (????) – Tenmoku Ikko
Natsume's Book of Friends (????) – Yōkai
Zetman (????) – Sayama
Tari Tari (????) – President
Aesthetica of a Rogue Hero
One Piece: Episode of Luffy - Adventure of Hand Island
Space Battleship Yamato 2199 (????) – Jūzō Okita
Gingitsune (????) – Jicchan
Kotoura-san (????) – Gantetsu Ishiyama
Samurai Flamenco (????) – Daisuke Hazama
Naruto: Shippuden (????) – First Hokage: Hashirama Senju
Space Dandy (????) – L'Delise (Ep. 18)
Psycho-Pass 2 (????) – Yohei Masuzaki (Ep. 7-9)
Tokyo Ghoul (????) – Yoshimura
Tokyo Ghoul √A (????) – Yoshimura
Aldnoah.Zero 2 – Rayregalia Vers Rayvers (Ep. 23)
The Heroic Legend of Arslan (????) – Andragoras III
Bungo Stray Dogs (????) – Herman Melville
Hell Girl: The Fourth Twilight (????) – Wanyūdo
Miss Kobayashi's Dragon Maid (????) – Tohru's father (ep. 7, 13)
Yu-Gi-Oh! VRAINS - Dr. Kogami
Princess Principal (????) – L (eps. 1 - 7), Narrator (ep. 1, 3)
Golden Kamuy (????) – Nagakura Shinpachi
Layton Mystery Tanteisha: Katori no Nazotoki File (????) – Danny Bacon (ep. 9)
Carole & Tuesday (????) – Schwartz
Vinland Saga (????) – Sweyn
The Rising of the Shield Hero – High Priest Biscas T. Balmus
Dragon's Dogma (????) – Dragon
Getter Robo Arc (2021) – Professor Saotome
The Genius Prince's Guide to Raising a Nation Out of Debt (2022) – Hagar
Shenmue (2022) – Iwao Hazuki
Bleach: Thousand-Year Blood War (2022) – Yhwach, Zangetsu
Giant Beasts of Ars (2023) – Bakura

Original video animation
Legend of the Galactic Heroes (2000) – Fang Tchewling
SaiKano: Another Love Song (2005) – Wada
Mobile Suit Gundam Unicorn (2010) – Cardeas Vist
Shiki (2010) – Iwao Maeda
One Off (2012) – Motoyoshi

Original net animation
Spriggan (2022) – Bowman

Anime films
3000 Leagues in Search of Mother (1999) – Pietro
Vexille (2007) – Captain Borg
Berserk: Golden Age Arc II: The Battle for Doldrey (2012) – Boscone
Uchū Senkan Yamato 2199: Hoshi-Meguru Hakobune (2014) – Jūzō Okita
The Empire of Corpses (2015) – The One

Video games
Final Fantasy XII (2006) – Reddas
Tales of Zestiria (2015) – Heldarf
Nioh (2017) – Tenkai
Ace Combat 7: Skies Unknown (2019) - Mihaly A. Shilage / Mister X
Monochrome Mobius: Rights and Wrongs Forgotten (2019) – Pashpakuru

Television drama
 Taiyō ni Hoero! (1981–82) (Murakami, Miura)
 Aoi Tokugawa Sandai (2000) (Konishi Yukinaga)
 Hell Girl (2006)

Tokusatsu
Special Rescue Exceedraft (1992) - Eiichiro Sorihashi (actor) (ep. 35)
Zyuden Sentai Kyoryuger (2013) – Hundred-Faced High Priest Chaos (eps. 1 - 7, 9 - 11, 14 - 18, 21 - 23, 25 - 30, 34 - 37, 40 - 42, 44 - 48)
Zyuden Sentai Kyoryuger: Gaburincho of Music (2013) – Hundred-Faced High Priest Chaos
Zyuden Sentai Kyoryuger vs. Go-Busters: The Great Dinosaur Battle! Farewell Our Eternal Friends (2014) – Hundred-Faced High Priest Chaos
Zyuden Sentai Kyoryuger Returns: Hundred Years After (2014) – Thousand-Faced High Priest Gaos

Dubbing

Live-action
Jean Reno
Léon: The Professional (1996 TV Asahi edition) – Léon
Godzilla – Philippe Roaché
The Crimson Rivers – Pierre Niemans
Just Visiting – Count Thibault of Malfete
Wasabi (2004 TV Tokyo edition) – Hubert Fiorentini
Rollerball (2005 TV Tokyo edition) – Alexi Petrovich
Crimson Rivers II: Angels of the Apocalypse – Pierre Niemans
L'Enquête Corse – Ange Leoni
Empire of the Wolves – Jean-Louis Schiffer
The Tiger and the Snow – Fuad
The Da Vinci Code – Bezu Fache
Flyboys – Capt. Thenault
The Pink Panther – Gendarme Gilbert Ponton
22 Bullets – Charly Matteï
Armored – Quinn
The Pink Panther 2 – Gendarme Gilbert Ponton
Alex Cross – Giles Mercier
The Chef – Alexandre Vauclair
Jo – Joseph "Jo" St-Clair
The Squad – Serge Buren
Mes trésors – Patrick
The Adventurers – Detective Pierre Bissette
Cold Blood – Henry
Tommy Lee Jones
Under Siege – William "Bill" Strannix
The Fugitive – Samuel Gerard
Heaven & Earth – Steve Butler
House of Cards – Jake Beerlander
Blown Away (1999 TV Asahi edition) – Ryan Gaerity
Blue Sky – Hank Marshall
The Client (1997 TV Asahi edition) – "Reverend" Roy Foltrigg
Batman Forever – Two-Face
Volcano – Mike Roark
Men in Black (2001 NTV edition) – Kevin Brown/Agent K
U.S. Marshals – Samuel Gerard
Double Jeopardy (2003 TV Asahi edition) – Travis Lehman
Space Cowboys (2004 NTV edition) – William "Hawk" Hawkins
Men in Black II (2005 TV Asahi edition) – Kevin Brown/Agent K
The Three Burials of Melquiades Estrada – Pete Perkins
No Country for Old Men – Ed Tom Bell
Hope Springs – Arnold Soames
Lincoln – Thaddeus Stevens
Mechanic: Resurrection – Max Adams
Criminal – Dr. Micah Franks
Shock and Awe – Joe Galloway
Ad Astra – H. Clifford McBride
Wander – Jimmy Cleats
Ed Harris
Needful Things – Sheriff Alan J. Pangborn
Cleaner – Eddie Lorenzo
Gone Baby Gone – Detective Sergeant Remy Bressant
National Treasure: Book of Secrets – Mitch Wilkinson
The Way Back – Mr. Smith
Man on a Ledge – David "Dave" Englander
Pain & Gain – Det. Ed Du Bois, III
Snowpiercer – Minister Wilford
Cymbeline – Cymbeline
Run All Night – Shawn Maguire
Mother! – man
Geostorm – U.S. Secretary of State Leonard Dekkom
Kodachrome – Benjamin Asher Ryder
Top Gun: Maverick – Chester "Hammer" Cain
Hugo Weaving
The Lord of the Rings film trilogy – Elrond
V for Vendetta – V
The Hobbit: An Unexpected Journey – Elrond
The Hobbit: The Battle of the Five Armies – Elrond
Jeff Bridges
The Big Lebowski (Blu-Ray edition) – Jeffrey "The Dude" Lebowski
Seventh Son – John Gregory
Kingsman: The Golden Circle – Champagne "Champ"
Bad Times at the El Royale – Father Daniel Flynn / Donald "Doc" O'Reilly
24 – Ramon Salazar (Joaquim de Almeida)
88 Minutes – Dr. Jack Gramm (Al Pacino)
The Admiral: Roaring Currents – Kurushima Michifusa (Ryu Seung-ryong)
Aladdin – The Sultan (Navid Negahban)
All Is True – William Shakespeare (Kenneth Branagh)
The Amazing Spider-Man – George Stacy (Denis Leary)
American Dreamz – President Joseph Staton (Dennis Quaid)
And Then There Were None – General John MacArthur (Sam Neill)
The Art of Racing in the Rain – the voice of Enzo (Kevin Costner)
Assassin's Creed: Lineage – Rodrigo Borgia (Manuel Tadros)
The A-Team – John "Hannibal" Smith (Liam Neeson)
Avatar – Colonel Miles Quaritch (Stephen Lang)
Avatar: The Way of Water – Colonel Miles Quaritch (Stephen Lang)
Bad Company – Adrik Vas (Peter Stormare)
Battle of the Sexes – Jack Kramer (Bill Pullman)
Baywatch – The Mentor (David Hasselhoff)
Below – Lieutenant Brice (Bruce Greenwood)
Beyond Valkyrie: Dawn of the 4th Reich – General Emil F. Reinhardt (Stephen Lang)
Black Dog – Jack Crews (Patrick Swayze)
Black Dog (2002 NTV edition) – ATF Agent McClaren (Stephen Tobolowsky)
Black Hawk Down (2004 TV Tokyo edition) – CPT Mike Steele (Jason Isaacs)
Black Widow – Thunderbolt Ross (William Hurt)
Blood Diamond – Colonel Coetzee (Arnold Vosloo)
Blue Bloods – Frank Reagan (Tom Selleck)
The Body - Jaime Peña (José Coronado)
The Bourne Identity – Alexander Conklin (Chris Cooper)
Boy Erased – Marshall Eamons (Russell Crowe)
Better Call Saul – Mike Ehrmantraut (Jonathan Banks)
Bionic Woman – Jonas Bledsoe (Miguel Ferrer)
Captain America: Civil War – Thunderbolt Ross (William Hurt)
Chef – Riva (Dustin Hoffman)
Clear and Present Danger – Jack Ryan (Harrison Ford)
Concussion – Dr. Julian Bailes (Alec Baldwin)
The Contract – Frank Carden (Morgan Freeman)
Criminal Minds (since season 9) – David Rossi (Joe Mantegna)
The Crow (1997 TV Tokyo edition) – Sergeant Daryl Albrecht (Ernie Hudson)
Daddy's Home 2 – Kurt Mayron (Mel Gibson)
Dae Jang Geum – Jung-jong (Im Ho)
Dead Again – Mike Church / Roman Strauss (Kenneth Branagh)
Death Proof – Stuntman Mike McKay (Kurt Russell)
Deep Rising (2000 TV Asahi edition) – John Finnegan (Treat Williams)
Denial – Richard Rampton (Tom Wilkinson)
Desperate Housewives – Karl Mayer (Richard Burgi)
Divergent and The Divergent Series: Insurgent – Marcus Eaton (Ray Stevenson)
Domino – Ed Moseby (Mickey Rourke)
El Camino: A Breaking Bad Movie – Mike Ehrmantraut (Jonathan Banks)
Elizabeth I – Earl of Leicester (Jeremy Irons)
Escape from L.A. – Pipeline (Peter Fonda)
Evolution – General Russell Woodman (Ted Levine)
Evolution (2005 NTV edition) – Governor Lewis (Dan Aykroyd)
The Exorcist: Director's Cut – Father Damien Karras (Jason Miller)
F9 – Buddy (Michael Rooker)
Fargo (2002 TV Tokyo edition) – Gaear Grimsrud (Peter Stormare)
Finding Forrester – Crawford (F. Murray Abraham)
Five Fingers – Ahmat (Laurence Fishburne)
Flesh and Bone – Arlis Sweeney (Dennis Quaid)
Fringe – Dr. Walter Bishop (John Noble)
The Glass House – Terrence Glass (Stellan Skarsgård)
The Godfather Saga – Tom Hagan (Robert Duvall)
Gods of Egypt – Ra (Geoffrey Rush)
The Great Escape (2000 TV Tokyo edition) – Flight Lieutenant Bob Hendley (James Garner)
Grudge Match – Billy "The Kid" McDonnen (Robert De Niro)
Halifax: Retribution – Tom Saracen (Anthony LaPaglia)
Hardwired – Hal (Michael Ironside)
Harry Potter and the Deathly Hallows – Part 2 – Aberforth Dumbledore (Ciarán Hinds)
The Hateful Eight – John Ruth (Kurt Russell)
Heat (1998 TV Asahi edition) – Lieutenant Vincent Hanna (Al Pacino)
Here and Now – Greg Boatwright (Tim Robbins)
Home Alone 2: Lost in New York (2019 Wowow edition) – Kevin (John Heard)
The Hundred-Foot Journey – Abbu "Papa" Kadam (Om Puri)
I Love You Phillip Morris – Lindholm (Antoni Corone)
Ignition – Jake Russo (Michael Ironside)
The Incredible Hulk – Thunderbolt Ross (William Hurt)
Iron Will – Harry Kingsley (Kevin Spacey)
Joker – Thomas Wayne (Brett Cullen)
Jurassic World Dominion – Dr. Alan Grant (Sam Neill)
Killers – Mr. Kornfeldt (Tom Selleck)
The Kingdom – Grant Sykes (Chris Cooper)
L.A. Confidential – Officer Wendell "Bud" White (Russell Crowe)
Last Action Hero (2001 TV Asahi edition) – Benedict (Charles Dance)
Leonardo – Andrea del Verrocchio (Giancarlo Giannini)
Life of Pi – The Cook (Gérard Depardieu)
Lions for Lambs – Professor Stephen Malley (Robert Redford)
The Machinist – Miller (Michael Ironside)
The Matrix Reloaded (2006 Fuji TV edition) – Commander Lock (Harry Lennix)
The Matrix Revolutions (2007 Fuji TV edition) – Commander Lock (Harry Lennix)
Mercury Rising (2001 TV Asahi edition) – Lieutenant Colonel Nicholas Kudrow (Alec Baldwin)
Merlin – Gaius (Anthony Head)
Midway – William "Bull" Halsey (Dennis Quaid)
Motherless Brooklyn – Frank Minna (Bruce Willis)
Mr. Deeds – Chuck Cedar (Peter Gallagher)
Musa – Rambulwha (Yu Rongguang)
No Good Deed – Tyrone Abernathy (Stellan Skarsgård)
Nurse Betty – Charlie (Morgan Freeman)
October Sky – John Hickam (Chris Cooper)
Once Upon a Time in Mexico – Billy Chambers (Mickey Rourke)
Only You – Giovanni (Joaquim de Almeida)
The Patriot – Benjamin Martin (Mel Gibson)
Patriot Games – Jack Ryan (Harrison Ford)
Pearl Harbor – Captain Harold Thurman (Dan Aykroyd)
Planet of the Apes (2005 NTV edition) – Colonel Attar (Michael Clarke Duncan)
Predator (1993 TV Asahi edition) – Dillon (Carl Weathers)
Pulp Fiction – Captain Koons (Christopher Walken)
Sabrina – Linus Larrabee (Harrison Ford)
Scarface (2004 DVD edition) – Frank Lopez (Robert Loggia)
The Second Best Exotic Marigold Hotel – Guy Chambers (Richard Gere)
Selma – Lyndon B. Johnson (Tom Wilkinson)
Shaolin Soccer – Hung (Patrick Tse)
Sliver – Jack Landsford (Tom Berenger)
Snow White and the Huntsman – Gort (Ray Winstone)
Sommersby – John "Jack" Sommersby (Richard Gere)
Speed (1998 TV Asahi edition) – Lieutenant Herb 'Mac' McMahon (Joe Morton)
Star Trek: The Motion Picture – Spock (Leonard Nimoy)
Stealth – Captain George Cummings (Sam Shepard)
Superman (2014 WOWOW edition) – Lex Luthor (Gene Hackman)
Superman II (2014 WOWOW edition) – Lex Luthor (Gene Hackman)
Tin Cup – David Simms (Don Johnson)
Transporter 3 – Leonid Tomilenko (Jeroen Krabbé)
Ultraman: The Ultimate Hero – Roger Schechter (Jeffrey Combs)
Unfaithful (2006 TV Asahi edition) – Edward Sumner (Richard Gere)
Valkyrie – Friedrich Fromm (Tom Wilkinson)
Wall Street: Money Never Sleeps – Bretton James (Josh Brolin)
War Horse – Ted Narracott (Peter Mullan)
The War with Grandpa – Ed Marino (Robert De Niro)
White House Farm – DS Stan Jones (Mark Addy)
 Your Honor – Michael Desiato (Bryan Cranston)

Animation
Capture the Flag – Frank Goldwing
Incredibles 2 – Rick Dicker 
Madagascar 3: Europe's Most Wanted – Vitaly
My Little Pony: Friendship Is Magic – Cranky Doodle Donkey
Star Wars: Clone Wars – General Grievous
Teenage Mutant Ninja Turtles – Master Splinter
The Lego Batman Movie – Alfred Pennyworth
The Lego Movie 2: The Second Part – Alfred Pennyworth, Dolphin Clock
The Wild – Kazar

References

External links
Official agency profile 
Takayuki Sugō at Ryu's Seiyuu Infos

1952 births
Living people
Japanese male stage actors
Japanese male video game actors
Japanese male voice actors
Male voice actors from Chiba Prefecture
20th-century Japanese male actors
21st-century Japanese male actors